Cerdeira is a surname. Notable people with the surname include:

Alexandre Cerdeira (born 1980), Brazilian footballer
Carmen Cerdeira (1958–2007), Spanish politician
Clemente Cerdeira Fernández (1887–1947), Spanish diplomat
Hilda Cerdeira (born 1942), Argentine-Brazilian physicist
Tales Cerdeira (born 1987), Brazilian swimmer